Pogliaghi was an Italian racing bicycle manufacturer, based in Milan, Italy.

The company was founded by Sante Pogliaghi in 1947.  Pogliaghi did much of the work, but had up to six staff by the late 1970s, when production increased from 300 frames a year to 800. 

Cyclists such as Patrick Sercu and Eddy Merckx used Pogliaghi frames.

Sante Pogliaghi's speciality was tandem, stayer and track bicycles.

Sante Pogliaghi died in 2000.

Pogliaghi sold or transferred rights to build bicycles under his name in the 1983-84. The difference between a Pogliaghi made under his direct supervision and one that may not be is the *PSM* stamp on the seat-lug, and a chronologically-sequential serial number on the seat-lug or the head-lug.  This serial number sequence appears to date all the way back to when Pogliaghi's uncle Brambilla owned the shop, where Sante Pogliaghi worked for him.  Pogliaghi continued the serial number sequence when he took over in the late 1940s.

Pogliaghi is on record stating he would retire by 1980, when he was interviewed for the book "The Custom Bicycle"  but he officially closed his workshop on 1983. The PSM stamp and the serial numbers disappeared after the marque transfer.

Marc Rossin supposedly took over rights to the marque first, and a number of Pogliaghis appeared with Rossin-style pantographing. Probably by the late 1980s rights to the name had passed to the Basso brothers.

See also

 List of bicycle parts
 List of Italian companies

External links 
 Pogliaghi Images - History
 Information on Pogliaghi manufacturing techniques
 Pogliaghi Bicycle Frame serial numbers

Sources 
 The Custom Bicycle, by Denise de la Rosa and Michael Kolin

Cycle manufacturers of Italy
Manufacturing companies based in Milan
Vehicle manufacturing companies established in 1947
Italian companies established in 1947
Italian brands